Jaroslav Hertl (born October 28, 1989) is a Czech former professional ice hockey defenceman.

Hertl played three games with HC Slavia Praha in the Czech Extraliga. He later played in the Slovak Extraliga for HKM Zvolen and MsHK Žilina and in the Polska Hokej Liga for GKS Tychy, before joining the Edinburgh Capitals of the Elite Ice Hockey League for the 2016-17 season. Ahead of the 2017-18 season, Hertl moved to France in June 2017 to sign for Yétis du Mont-Blanc.

His younger brother Tomáš Hertl is also an ice hockey player and currently plays for the San Jose Sharks.

References

External links

1989 births
Living people
HC Berounští Medvědi players
Brampton Battalion players
Czech ice hockey defencemen
Edinburgh Capitals players
BK Havlíčkův Brod players
LHK Jestřábi Prostějov players
HC Kobra Praha players
HC Slavia Praha players
Ice hockey people from Prague
GKS Tychy (ice hockey) players
MsHK Žilina players
HKM Zvolen players
Czech expatriate ice hockey people
Czech expatriate ice hockey players in Slovakia
Czech expatriate sportspeople in Scotland
Expatriate ice hockey players in Scotland
Czech expatriate sportspeople in Poland
Czech expatriate sportspeople in France
Expatriate ice hockey players in France
Expatriate ice hockey players in Poland
Czech expatriate ice hockey players in Canada